G 1/10 is a decision issued on 23 July 2012 by the Enlarged Board of Appeal of the European Patent Office (EPO), holding that  cannot be used to request corrections of the text of a European patent.

Overview
The referral lies from interlocutory decision T 1145/09 by Technical Board of Appeal 3.5.03, who referred two questions to the Enlarged Board.

The first question was: 

The second question was: 

In its answer to the first question, the Enlarged Board of Appeal ruled that "since  is not available to correct the text of a patent, a patent proprietor's request for such a correction is inadmissible whenever made, including after the initiation of opposition proceedings." In its answer to the second question, it ruled that "in view of the answer to the first referred question, the second referred question requires no answer."

See also 
 Amendments under the European Patent Convention

References

Further reading 
: "Correction of errors in the description, claims and drawings after grant, and in opposition proceedings" 
: "Scope of " 
: "Correction of the text of a patent"
: "Correction requests as opposed to appeals"
: "Decisions with no text submitted or agreed by the applicant - deemed approval under "
: "Amendments after the decision to grant"
: "Admissibility of amendments - principles"
: "Admissibility of amendments - removal of error (in claim) in opposition proceedings "

External links 
 Decision G 1/10, Official Journal EPO 4/2013, 194
Decision T 1145/09 (Stay of proceedings/FISHER-ROSEMOUNT) of 17 June 2010 (referring decision)

G 2010 1
2012 in case law
2012 in Europe